"Everybody's Got the Right to Love" is a socially conscious–inspired pop song written by Lou Stallman, produced by Frank Wilson and released as a single in 1970 by Motown group The Supremes, who took the song into the top forty in mid-1970 following the release of "Up the Ladder to the Roof".

Song information
The songs features new Supremes lead singer Jean Terrell in lead, with backup vocals by original Supreme Mary Wilson and more recent member Cindy Birdsong. The lyrics describe how everyone should be able to love, saying "without love you can't survive". This is the first song that showcases the group's vocals as a group, which had not been done since the late 1960s. At the start of the song the quartet sings, "..Say I/Say Yeah..", in harmony. There are at least three different versions of the song. One appears on the Supremes' "70's Greatest Hits & Rare Classics" and the other on The Supremes (2000 album).

Charts
The song became a top 30 hit for the Supremes peaking at number 21 on the Billboard Hot 100 and reaching number 11 on the R&B chart. "Everybody's Got the Right to Love' was the second of eight top forty singles the Supremes scored after the departure of Diana Ross. It did not make the top 50 in the UK Singles Chart, interrupting an otherwise successful run of top ten hits for the group in Britain.

Weekly charts

Year-end charts

Personnel
Lead vocals by Jean Terrell
Background vocals by Jean Terrell, Mary Wilson and Cindy Birdsong
Instrumentation by The Funk Brothers

References

1970 singles
1970 songs
The Supremes songs
Songs written by Lou Stallman
Motown singles